Ventimiglia is a city in Liguria, Italy near the French border.

Ventimiglia may also refer to:

Places
 Ventimiglia di Sicilia, a city in Sicily, Italy
 Castle of Ventimiglia (or castle of Bonifato), ancient castle built at the end of the 14th century by the Ventimiglia family
 Ventimiglia Vineyard, a winery in New Jersey
 Genoa–Ventimiglia railway, railway running along the coast of the Liguria region of Italy
 Marseille–Ventimiglia railway, 259-kilometre long railway line running between France and Italy

People
Ventimiglia family, an Italian noble family 
Cesare Ventimiglia (1573–1645), Roman Catholic prelate who served as Bishop of Terracina, Priverno e Sezze (1615–1645)
Gerolamo Ventimiglia (1644–1709), Roman Catholic prelate who served as Bishop of Lipari (1694–1709)
Giovanni Ventimiglia, Italian Professor for Philosophy
Giovanni II Ventimiglia, 6th Marquis of Geraci (died 1553), 16th-century Italian nobility, Marquess of Geraci from 1436
John Ventimiglia (born 1963), Italian-American actor
Mario Ventimiglia (1921–2005), Italian professional football player, manager and chairman
Milo Ventimiglia (born 1977), Italian-American actor
Ugo Ventimiglia (died 1172), Italian cardinal